The Laser Man  is a 1988 Hong Kong film in the style of a crime drama parody.

External links

1988 films
Hong Kong crime comedy-drama films
1980s parody films
1980s crime comedy-drama films
1988 comedy-drama films
1980s Hong Kong films